They Won't Forget is a 1937 American drama film directed by Mervyn LeRoy and starring Claude Rains, Gloria Dickson, Edward Norris, and Lana Turner, in her feature debut. It was based on a novel by Ward Greene called Death in the Deep  South, which was in turn a fictionalized account of a real-life case: the trial and subsequent lynching of Leo Frank after the murder of Mary Phagan in 1913.

Plot
A southern town is rocked by scandal when teenager Mary Clay is murdered on Confederate Memorial Day.  A district attorney with political ambitions, Andrew Griffin, sees the crime as his way to the Senate if he can find the right scapegoat to be tried for the crime. He seeks out Robert Hale, Mary's teacher at the business school where she was killed. Even though all evidence against Hale is circumstantial, Hale happens to be from New York (Leo Frank was a Southerner from Texas, but he was Jewish and had been raised in New York), and Griffin works with reporter William Brock to create a media frenzy of prejudice and hatred against the teacher. The issue moves from innocence or guilt to the continuing bigotry and suspicion between South and North, especially given the significance of the day of the murder.

The film shows the immense pressures brought to bear on members of the community to help in the conviction – the black janitor who is induced to lie on the stand for fear he himself will be convicted if Hale is found innocent; the juror who is the sole holdout to a guilty verdict; and the barber who is afraid to testify to something he knows because it could exonerate Hale. Michael Gleason, Hale's lawyer, does his best, but Hale is convicted and sentenced to death.

The governor of the state, with the support of his wife, decides to commit political suicide by commuting Hale's death sentence to life imprisonment because the evidence is simply insufficient to send a man to his death. The townsfolk are enraged, and the murdered girl's brothers, who have been threatening all along to take matters into their own hands if Hale is not executed, plot and carry out Hale's abduction and lynching with the help of a vengeful mob.

Afterward, Hale's widow goes to Griffin's office to return a check he had sent her to help her out, telling him he cannot soothe his conscience that way. As he and Brock watch her leave the building, Brock wonders if Hale was guilty. Griffin replies without much concern, "I wonder."

Cast

 Claude Rains as District Attorney Andrew J. Griffin
 Gloria Dickson as Sybil Hale
 Edward Norris as Professor Robert Perry Hale
 Otto Kruger as Michael Gleason
 Allyn Joslyn as William A. Brock
 Lana Turner as Mary Clay
 Linda Perry as Imogene Mayfield
 Elisha Cook, Jr. as Joe Turner
 Cy Kendall as Detective Laneart
 Clinton Rosemond as Tump Redwine
 E. Alyn Warren as Professor Carlisle P. Buxton
 Elisabeth Risdon as Mrs. Hale 
 Clifford Soubier as Jim Timberlake
 Granville Bates as Pindar
 Ann Shoemaker as Mrs. Mountford
 Paul Everton as Governor Thomas Mountford
 Donald Briggs as Harmon Drake
 Sibyl Harris as Mrs. Clay
 Trevor Bardette as Shattuck Clay
 Elliott Sullivan as Luther Clay
 Wilmer Hines as Ransom Scott Clay
 Eddie Acuff as Fred
 Frank Faylen as Bill Price
 Leonard Mudie as Judge Moore
 Harry Davenport as Confederate Veteran
 Harry Beresford as Confederate Veteran
 Edward McWade as Confederate Veteran
 Ronald Reagan as Man in Crowd (uncredited)

Critical reception
Frank S. Nugent of The New York Times called the film "a brilliant sociological drama and a trenchant film editorial against intolerance and hatred." Writing for Night and Day in 1937, Graham Greene gave the film a good review, comparing its effect to that of Fritz Lang's Fury. Greene found that "the direction of the picture is brilliant", and praised the writing for having "a better, less compromising story". However, he confessed that he "doubt[ed] that They Won't Forget [would] have the same success [as Fury]".

More recently, the film review website Allmovie.com gave the film five out of five stars.

In the documentary film I Am Not Your Negro, James Baldwin's unpublished notes recall the impression the face of the terrified black suspect left on him.

Other versions
The story was also dramatized in 1987 as a four-hour television miniseries entitled The Murder of Mary Phagan, written by Larry McMurtry and starring Jack Lemmon, Kevin Spacey, Rebecca Miller, Cynthia Nixon and William H. Macy.

References

External links
 
 
 
 

1937 films
1937 drama films
American black-and-white films
American courtroom films
American films based on actual events
American legal drama films
1930s English-language films
Films about capital punishment
Films about educators
Films about miscarriage of justice
Films about antisemitism
Films about prejudice
Films based on American novels
Films directed by Mervyn LeRoy
Films scored by Adolph Deutsch
Films with screenplays by Robert Rossen
Lynching in the United States
Warner Bros. films
1930s American films